Jiangcheng Hani and Yi Autonomous County is an autonomous county under the jurisdiction of Pu'er City, in southern Yunnan, China, bordering Laos and Vietnam to the south, making it the only county in the province to border more than one country.

Geography and climate
Located at an altitude of above , Jiangcheng, as with much of southern Yunnan, has a warm humid subtropical climate (Köppen Cwa), with muddled distinction between the seasons and daytime temperatures remaining warm year-round.

Administrative divisions
In the present, Jiangcheng Hani and Yi Autonomous County has 5 towns and 2 townships.
5 towns

2 townships
 Guoqing
 Jiahe

Ethnic groups
The Jiangcheng County Gazetteer (1989:351-368) lists the following ethnic subgroups, as well as locations.

Yi
Luoluo 倮倮 (Gaisu 改苏 branch)
Xiangtang 香堂 (Lalu 腊鲁 branch)
Alu 阿鲁 (Lalu 腊鲁 branch)
Laowu 老乌/Lawu 拉乌: (Awu 阿武 branch)
Azong 阿宗 (allonym for an Yi subgroup)
Menghua 蒙化
Dai
Dry Dai 旱傣: Mankelao 曼克老, Zhongping 中坪, Basan 坝伞
Water Dai 水傣: Zhengdong township 整董乡
Flowery-Waist Dai 花腰傣: Shuicheng township 水城乡
White Dai 白傣: Baliu 坝溜, Lazhu township 拉朱乡 and Tukahe 土卡河, Longtan township 龙塘乡
Yao: pop. 2,965 (1986)
Lahu: pop. 1,321 (1986)
Banhe Lahu Ethnic Township 板河拉祜族乡
Chashulin 茶树林, Gale Township 嘎勒乡

Hani
Hani subgroups in Jiangcheng County are (Jiangcheng County Gazetteer 1989:351):

Hani
Biyue 碧约 branch
Kaduo 卡多 branch
Kabie 卡别 branch
Enu branch 哦怒
Ximoluo 西摩洛
Haoni branch 豪尼
Baihong 白宏
Bukong 布孔 (also called Mahei 麻黑)
Budu 布都 (also called Asuo 阿梭, Duota 堕塔, Duota Asuo 堕塔阿梭)
Asuo 阿梭
Duota 多塔
Hani branch 哈尼
Qidi 期弟
Lami 腊米

Other names for the Hani include:
Baike 白壳
Benren 本人
Aka 阿卡
Podu 颇都
Mahei 麻黑
Woni 窝尼

References

External links
Jiangcheng County Official Site

County-level divisions of Pu'er City
Hani autonomous counties
Yi autonomous counties